Rui Alberto de Figueiredo Soares (born 1956) is a Cape Verdean politician. Figueiredo Soares served as foreign minister of Cape Verde under President António Mascarenhas Monteiro from 12 August 1999 – 2002. He was elected to the National Assembly from São Vicente under the Movement for Democracy in the 2006 parliamentary election.

References

1956 births
Living people
Members of the National Assembly (Cape Verde)
Foreign ministers of Cape Verde
Movement for Democracy (Cape Verde) politicians